Association Sportive Taiarapu Football Club, is a football club from Taiarapu-Ouest, Tahiti. It currently competes at Tahiti Ligue 1. It merged from the fusion of two previous teams, the AS Vairao and the AS Roniu.

Current squad
Squad for the 2019-20 Tahiti Ligue 2

References

External links
 AS Taiarapu FC website

Football clubs in Tahiti
Football clubs in French Polynesia
Association football clubs established in 2015
2015 establishments in French Polynesia